Shi (trad. 時, simp. 时) is a Chinese surname meaning "season" or "time". It is romanized Shih in Wade–Giles, or Si in Cantonese romanization. According to a 2013  study, it was the 187th most common name in China; it was shared by 670,000 people, or 0.05% of the population, with the province with the most people being Henan. It is the 83rd name on the Hundred Family Surnames poem.

Origins
 It is said to originate in the Spring and Autumn Period, from Shen Shushi (申叔时), a doctor from the Chu state. Originally pronounced "chi," it later became "shi."
 Another origin says that the name comes from the lord of Shiyi (时邑).

Notable people
Shi Yue (时越), Go player
Shi Lemeng (时乐濛), composer
Shi Pei Pu (时佩璞), opera singer
Shi Jian (时间), footballer

Fictional people
Shi Qian (时迁), character from Water Margin

References

Individual Chinese surnames